Guyvalvoria is a genus of sea slugs, aeolid nudibranchs, marine gastropod molluscs in the family Tergipedidae.

Species
Species within the genus Guyvalvoria include:
 Guyvalvoria francaisi Vayssière, 1906
 Guyvalvoria gruzovi Martynov, 2006
 Guyvalvoria paradoxa (Eliot, 1907)
 Guyvalvoria savinkini Martynov, 2006

References 

Tergipedidae